The Europe and Africa Zone is one of the three zones of the regional Davis Cup competition in 2013.

In the Europe and Africa Zone there are four different groups in which teams compete against each other to advance to the next group. Winners in Group I advance to the World Group Play-offs, along with losing teams from the World Group first round. Teams who lose their respective ties will compete in the relegation play-offs, with winning teams remaining in Group I, whereas teams who lose their play-offs will be relegated to the Europe/Africa Group II in 2014.

Great Britain, Netherlands, Poland and Ukraine won their second-round ties, and competed in the World Group Play-offs in mid-September.

South Africa and Denmark were defeated in the play-offs and were relegated to play the Europe/Africa Zone Group II in 2014.

Participating teams

Seeds:

Remaining nations:

Draw
All seeded teams get a bye into the second round, as well as Great Britain who were second round losers in the 2012 Davis Cup

 and  relegated to Group II in 2014.

First round

Poland vs. Slovenia

Romania vs. Denmark

Ukraine vs. Slovak Republic

Second round

Great Britain vs. Russia

 It was the first time since 1930 that Great Britain had won after being 2-0 down.

Poland vs. South Africa

Romania vs. Netherlands

Ukraine vs. Sweden

First round play-offs

Slovenia vs. South Africa

Slovakia vs. Sweden

Second round play-offs

Russia vs. South Africa

Sweden vs. Denmark

References

Euro Africa Zone I
Davis Cup Europe/Africa Zone